Illanmaster or Illaunmaistir is an uninhabited steep rocky island rising to about 100m, lying just off the north coast of County Mayo, Ireland and  west of Ballycastle. Grid ref: F 933 435. The island is separated from the mainland by a narrow sound.

Wildlife
It has breeding puffins and storm petrels, and in winter is used by a small flock of barnacle geese. The island is managed as a nature reserve by BirdWatch Ireland. The reserve is inaccessible but can be viewed from the mainland.

References

Islands of County Mayo
Uninhabited islands of Ireland
Gaeltacht places in County Mayo